Tainsar is a village & it comes in the range of Tileibani block of Debagarh district of Odisha, an eastern state of India. It is home to around 250 families. A mixture of pure Odia and Sambalpuri(a dialect of Odia) is spoken(known as Debagarhia) in the village. Farming is a common practice in the village.

References

External links

Villages in Debagarh district